L'innocenza giustificata (Innocence Justified) is an opera by the composer Christoph Willibald Gluck. It takes the form of a festa teatrale in one act. The Italian-language libretto combines recitatives by Giacomo Durazzo with arias by Pietro Metastasio. The opera premiered on 8 December 1755 at the Burgtheater in Vienna.

Roles

Recordings
L'innocenza giustificata María Bayo (Claudia), Veronica Cangemi (Flavio), Andreas Karasiak (Valerio), Marina De Liso (Flaminia), ChorWerk Ruhr, Cappella Coloniensis, conducted by Christopher Moulds (Deutsche Harmonia Mundi, 2004)

Sources
Booklet notes to the Moulds recording by Ingo Dorfmüller
Holden, Amanda The Viking Opera Guide (Viking, 1993), page 373.
Gluck-Gesamtausgabe. L'innocenza giustificata. Institut für Musikwissenschaft, Goethe-Universität

1755 operas
Italian-language operas
Operas by Christoph Willibald Gluck
Opera world premieres at the Burgtheater
Operas